Samuel Robert Torrance  (born 24 August 1953) is a Scottish professional golfer and sports commentator. He was one of the leading players on the European Tour from the mid-1970s to the late 1990s, with 21 Tour wins. Torrance was a member of European Ryder Cup teams on eight occasions consecutively; on Cup-winning teams four times. He was also part of the winning Scotland team at the 1995 Dunhill Cup.  He was the winning non-playing captain of the European Ryder Cup team in 2002. Torrance was honoured with the MBE (1996) and OBE (2003), for his outstanding contributions to golf.

Early life
Torrance was born and grew up in Largs on the westcoast of Scotland, playing golf at Routenburn Golf Club, near his family home. His father Bob (1932-2014) was a highly respected golf instructor who coached son Sam from childhood.

Torrance represented Scotland against England at Boy's International Match at Hillside, Southport, England in August 1970.

He turned professional at the age of 17, and his first job was at Sunningdale, where he used to play for money with members, which was much needed because he was paid only £5 a week as an assistant professional.

Professional career

European Tour
In 1970, Torrance joined the tour, which officially became the European Tour in 1972. He achieved his first professional win in 1972, and won the Sir Henry Cotton Rookie of the Year award in the same year. He recorded his first European Tour win in 1976.

He won 21 times on the European Tour; only fellow Scot Colin Montgomerie has accumulated more European Tour titles without winning one of golf's four major championships. His best finish on the European Tour Order of Merit was second, which he achieved in 1984 and 1995. In total, he finished in the top-10 on the list 10 times. He previously held the record for the most career appearances on the European Tour, with 706. At the 2020 Hero Open, Miguel Ángel Jiménez passed Torrance for most starts on the European Tour.

Torrance played in The Open Championship 28 times, with a best finish of tied 5th in 1981 at Royal St George's Golf Club in Sandwich, England.

Other tours
On his first visit on the PGA Tour of Australasia, at the time named the PGA Tour of Australia, Torrance finished second to George Serhan at the 1980 New South Wales Open in beginning of November and the week after he won the Australian PGA Championship at Royal Melbourne Golf Club, beating Seve Ballesteros by two strokes. The year after, Torrance came back to Australia, capping a second-place finish in October, after losing in a playoff to Eamonn Darcy at the 1981 CBA West Lakes Classic.

On a rare visit on the U.S.-based PGA Tour, in October 1983, trying to tune up for the Ryder Cup match to be played in Florida later the same month, Torrance finished tied first after 72 holes at the 1983 Southern Open at the Green Island Country Club in Columbus, Georgia. This was the first time he ever made the cut on a PGA Tour tournament. He eventually lost in a playoff against Ronnie Black on the fourth extra hole.

The year after, he was again close to victory on another continent. He lost in a playoff on the Japan Golf Tour to home player Masahiro Kuramoto at the 1984 Bridgestone Tournament at Sodegaura Country Club, Chiba, Japan. That year he also finished in second place at the Malaysian Open, tying Australia's Terry Gale for second, two behind Taiwan's Lu Chien-soon. Torrance reached another second place in Japan at the 1987 Casio World Open, losing by two strokes to American David Ishii, after leading or tying the lead after each of the first three rounds.

European Senior Tour
In 2003, upon turning 50, Torrance became eligible to play in senior tournaments, and he picked up his first win on the European Senior Tour in 2004. He finished first on the European Senior Tour's Order of Merit in 2005, 2006 and 2009, but never won a senior major. His best finish was lone 5th in the Senior Open Championship, achieved in 2009, which was the same result as his best finish in The Open and a regular major.

Torrance retired from competitive golf after playing his last event on the European Senior Tour, at the time named the Staysure Tour, in October 2017.

Ryder Cup
Torrance played for Europe in the Ryder Cup eight times, from 1981 to 1995 consecutively; the Cup is contested every two years. In 1985 he sank the winning putt on the 18th green at The Belfry, England, which deprived the Americans of the trophy for the first time in 28 years. He also was a member of Cup-winning teams in 1987 (first-ever win for Europe on American soil), 1989 and 1995. In 2002, he was the non-playing captain on the European team which won the 2002 Cup at The Belfry. This made him the second European to sink the winning putt and captain a winning team at separate Ryder Cups, after Seve Ballesteros in 1987 (as a player) and 1997 (as captain). He was also named a vice-captain for the 2016 Ryder Cup at Hazeltine by captain Darren Clarke.

World Cup and Alfred Dunhill Cup
Torrance represented Scotland eleven times at the World Cup and nine times at the Alfred Dunhill Cup.

Team Scotland twice finished second in the World Cup with Torrance on the two-man-team, 1984 with Gordon Brand Jnr and 1987 with Sandy Lyle. Individually, Torrance finished tied 5th at the 1978 World Cup in Hanalei, Hawaii and 3rd at the 1995 World Cup of Golf at the Mission Hills Golf Club in Shenzhen, China.

He was part of the winning Scotland team, with Colin Montgomerie and Andrew Coltart, at the 1995 Dunhill Cup at the Old Course at St Andrews in Scotland. The home team beat Zimbabwe in the final 2–1, where Torrance won over Mark McNulty.

Playing style
During his prime, Torrance was known for long driving and accurate short iron play, often played in a daring style.

Torrance was also an early user of the broomhandle putter. After a disappointing 1988 season on the greens, Torrance experimented with the long putter that was already being used successfully in the U.S. He debuted his version, which anchored on the chin rather than the midriff, at the 1989 Jersey Open and subsequently finished in the top five. He has used it relatively successfully ever since.

Family, honours
Torrance married English actress Suzanne Danielle in 1988. They have four children.

Torrance's father Bob also coached Sam's son Daniel who played golf to a high level, competing with Sam at the Dunhill Links Championship in the Pro Am competition, winning it once.

Torrance was awarded an MBE in 1996 for services to golf, and an OBE in the 2003 New Year Honours List, for his captaincy of Europe's Ryder Cup team.

Books, broadcasting career
Torrance is the author or co-author of several golf books; Play It Again, Sam: The Autobiography (2001), An Enduring Passion: My Ryder Cup Years (2003), Sam: The Autobiography of Sam Torrance, Golf's Ryder Cup Winning Hero (2003), With Friends Like These: A Selective History of the Ryder Cup (2006), Out of Bounds: Legendary Tales From the 19th Hole (2012).

Torrance has worked as a commentator for BBC Sport golf coverage. Along with Kelly Tilghman, he also provided commentary for Tiger Woods PGA Tour 09.

Torrance has appeared on the sport personality quiz show A Question of Sport five times since 2005. In October 2006, he took over nine minutes to consider with his teammates Ally McCoist and Michael Holding the question, "Who is the only golfer from Europe or the United States to have won two majors without making a Ryder Cup appearance", eventually correctly answering John Daly. On 17 March 2008, he competed with Sharron Davies and team captain Phil Tufnell in the 37th season of A Question of Sport, and made history by achieving the first-ever perfect score on the show since it started in 1970.

He is a supporter of Celtic and Manchester United football clubs.

Professional wins (46)

European Tour wins (21)

*Note: Tournament shortened to 54 holes due to weather.

European Tour playoff record (4–2)

PGA Tour of Australasia wins (1)

PGA Tour of Australasia playoff record (0–1)

Safari Circuit wins (1)

South American Golf Circuit wins (1)

Other wins (11)
1972 Lord Derby's Under-25 Match Play Championship, Radici Open (Italy)
1975 Scottish Uniroyal Tournament
1978 Scottish Professional Championship
1979 Skol Tournament
1980 Scottish Professional Championship
1982 Skol Tournament
1985 Scottish Professional Championship
1991 Scottish Professional Championship
1993 Scottish Professional Championship
2006 Hassan II Golf Trophy

European Senior Tour wins (11)

European Senior Tour playoff record (1–1)

Playoff record
PGA Tour playoff record (0–1)

Japan Golf Tour playoff record (0–1)

Results in major championships

CUT = missed the half-way cut (3rd round cut in 1973, 1977 and 1978 Open Championships)
"T" indicates a tie for a place

Summary

Most consecutive cuts made – 10 (1980 Open Championship – 1988 Open Championship)
Longest streak of top-10s – 1 (twice)

Results in senior major championships
Results are not in chronological order before 2016.

CUT = missed the halfway cut
"T" indicates a tie for a place.
Note: Torrance never played in the Senior Players Championship.

Team appearances
Ryder Cup (representing Europe): 1981, 1983, 1985 (winners), 1987 (winners), 1989 (tied and retained trophy), 1991, 1993, 1995 (winners), 2002 (winners, non-playing captain)
World Cup (representing Scotland): 1976, 1978, 1982, 1984, 1985, 1987, 1989, 1990, 1991, 1993, 1995
Double Diamond International (representing Scotland): 1973 (winners), 1976, 1977
Hennessy Cognac Cup (representing Great Britain and Ireland): 1976 (winners), 1978 (winners), 1980 (winners), 1982 (winners), (representing Scotland) 1984
Alfred Dunhill Cup (representing Scotland): 1985, 1986, 1987, 1989, 1990, 1991, 1993, 1995 (winners), 1999
Four Tours World Championship (representing Europe): 1985, 1991 (winners, captain)
UBS Cup (representing the Rest of the World): 2001, 2002, 2004
Seve Trophy (representing Great Britain & Ireland): 2013 (non-playing captain)

See also
List of golfers with most European Tour wins
List of golfers with most European Senior Tour wins

References

External links

Scottish male golfers
European Tour golfers
European Senior Tour golfers
PGA Tour Champions golfers
Ryder Cup competitors for Europe
Golf writers and broadcasters
BBC sports presenters and reporters
Officers of the Order of the British Empire
Sportspeople from North Ayrshire
People from Largs
People from Virginia Water
1953 births
Living people